Wanguri is an electoral division of the Legislative Assembly in Australia's Northern Territory. It was first created in 1983. Wanguri is an urban electorate, covering 29 km², and taking in the north Darwin suburbs of Wanguri, Karama and Leanyer. There were 6,111 people enrolled within the electorate as of August 2020.

Like most electorates in the Territory, Wanguri has a tendency to keep its incumbent members regardless of party. While the Country Liberal Party held it for six years after its creation in 1983, the Labor Party have held it since a 1989 by-election, and it is now reckoned as reasonably safe for that party. Paul Henderson was not expected to have much difficulty retaining Wanguri at the 2005 election, and ultimately held the seat with a strong swing in his favour.

When Henderson resigned in 2013, following his government's defeat in the 2012 election, the resulting by-election saw Nicole Manison hold the seat for Labor.  Manison managed to pick up a 12.4 percent swing—according to ABC election analyst Antony Green, the largest against a first term government in Australia in over twenty years.  It was enough to revert Wanguri to its traditional status as a comfortably safe Labor seat.  Manison consolidated her hold on the seat in the 2016 election, increasing her majority to 19.6 percent.  As a result, Wanguri is the third-safest in the Territory and the second-safest seat in the Darwin area.

Members for Wanguri

Election results

References

External links
Division profile from the Northern Territory Electoral Commission

Wanguri